Leslie Gordon Douglas (December 5, 1918 – October 20, 2002) was a Canadian professional ice hockey player who played 52 games in the National Hockey League with the Detroit Red Wings between 1940 and 1946. He won the Stanley Cup with Detroit in 1943. The rest of his career, which lasted from 1937 to 1956, was spent in various minor leagues. Douglas was born in Perth, Ontario.

Career statistics

Regular season and playoffs

References 
 
 Obituary at LostHockey.com

1918 births
2002 deaths
Buffalo Bisons (AHL) players
Canadian expatriates in the United States
Canadian ice hockey centres
Cleveland Barons (1937–1973) players
Detroit Red Wings players
Ice hockey people from Ontario
Indianapolis Capitals players
Montreal Royals (QSHL) players
Ontario Hockey Association Senior A League (1890–1979) players
Ottawa Senators (QSHL) players
People from Perth, Ontario
Stanley Cup champions